Jónína Leósdóttir (born 16 May 1954) is an Icelandic novelist, playwright, former journalist and Spouse of the Prime Minister of Iceland from 2008 until 2013.

She is the author of a dozen plays, eleven novels, two biographies and a collection of articles she originally wrote for a women's magazine. Her books have been translated into several languages.

She is married to the former Icelandic Prime Minister Jóhanna Sigurðardóttir, who was the first openly lesbian head of government in modern history. They were one of the first same-sex couples in Iceland to get married (in 2010, shortly after the law took effect, and while Jóhanna was in office); and until 2015, Jónína was the only modern person to have been the same-sex spouse of a sitting head of government (Belgium's Elio Di Rupo has never been married, while Luxembourg's Xavier Bettel was unable to legally marry until 1 January 2015). The pair met in 1983.

She wrote her first book, Sundur og saman (Back and Forth) in 1993. The book was about a child whose parents divorced. She has now written a book about her relationship with the former prime minister.

She has a BA in English and Literature from the University of Iceland, and has worked at the University of Essex.

See also
Spouse of the Prime Minister of Iceland

References

External links
Jónína Leósdóttir's personal webpage
Jónína Leósdóttir's page on the website of the Icelandic Association of Playwrights and Screenwriters
Jónína Leósdóttir's page on Literature.is, a website containing information about contemporary Icelandic authors and their work
 
 Jónína Leósdóttir on Outlook
 Jónína Leósdóttir on Woman's Hour
 Jónína Leósdóttir interview in The Telegraph
 Jónína Leósdóttir interview in El País
 Jónína Leósdóttir interview in The Times

1954 births
Jonina Leosdottir
20th-century dramatists and playwrights
20th-century Icelandic women writers
Jonina Leosdottir
21st-century dramatists and playwrights
21st-century Icelandic women writers
Jonina Leosdottir
Jonina Leosdottir
Jonina Leosdottir
Jonina Leosdottir
Jonina Leosdottir
Living people
Jonina Leosdottir
Jonina Leosdottir
Women dramatists and playwrights